Big Brother VIP 2021, also known as Big Brother VIP 1 was the first season of Big Brother VIP, hosted by Arbana Osmani. The season began airing on 5 October 2021 on Top Channel, and ended after 137 days on 18 February 2022. The viewers can watch for the whole season live from the house in two live pay-per-view channels, with the name Big Brother VIP 1 and Big Brother VIP 2, which are available on Albanian TV platform DigitAlb. The two opinionists in the live evictions shows, were Arbër Hajdari and Balina Bodinaku. Dojna Mema hosted the spin-off show Big Brother VIP – Fans' Club and Iva Tiço was the opinionist.

The show was originally scheduled to last 100 days, with the finale on 11 January 2022. However, due to satisfactory ratings, the show was extended by over one month, making it the longest Albanian season overall, with 137 days.

On 18 February 2022, Ilir Shaqiri was announced as the winner of the season, having received 35% of the final vote, with Donald Veshaj as the runner-up after receiving 30%. Shaqiri won a €100,000 prize.

Production
The celebrity version of the show was expected to start during the 2017–2018 television season. In 2019, Top Channel announced that Big Brother would come back for the 2019–2020 television season in Albania, but they didn't say if will be an original or a celebrity version. On 12 August 2021, Top Channel confirmed that the season would air in October 2021. On 30 September 2021, Top Channel announced that the show will begin airing on 5 October 2021.

Promotion 
The first trailer of the show premiered on 29 January 2018 and read "...It's hard, being a VIP! They deserve to relax! And where is the VIP resort?! Big Brother Vip ... coming soon only on Top Channel." Top Channel released in August 2021, a trailer and read "We have been told that you miss him." and at the end of the trailer we hear Arbana Osmani telling "Returns soon to Top Channel.".

House 
In the original version of Big Brother Albania, the house was located in different towns including Gërdec and Kashar. The celebrity version was filmed in Studio Nova in Tirana.

Housemates  
On Day 1, fourteen housemates entered the house during launch. As time went on, sixteen new people were introduced, making for a total of thirty housemates in the season.

DJ PM and DJ Dagz were eliminated on the 74th day, but Big Brother decided to open a televoting and the public would decide who'd come back in the Big Brother house. The public decided for DJ Dagz to come back and he reentered the house as a single player.

Igli Zarka, was forced to leave the house few days after he entered, on 8 November, due to health problems.

Fifi, also decided to leave the house, as she said she wasn't feeling good enough to keep on the game. It all started when she started to express her feelings towards Granit Cana, and he said to her that sees her as a sister. She had an emotional breakdown in the middle of the night and everyone claimed she had psychological problems. It was just the beginning, as she had a really harsh debate with the opinionist, Balina Bodinaku, on the Tuesday, 23 November live show. Balina claimed that Fifi wasn't a fan of Sarah Berisha and DJ PM's love, she was just seeking attention. Fifi said that it was a really hard count towards her, and she wasn't absolutely seeking attention. Bodinaku insisted on her own opinion, and Fifi asked to leave the house immediately. That's where she fainted and everyone panicked. She was ready to leave the house but after a lot of conversation in the diary room with the host, Arbana Osmani, Fifi decided to stay in the house and keep on the game. Two days later, she decided to leave the house by saying she needed to take care of herself.

Big Mama entered the house on Day 60. However, she left the Big Brother house on 24 December live show, after a very harsh debate with Antonela Berisha. Berisha claimed that she had offended her in serbian. That's when Big Mama exploded and started insulting Berisha by saying she's immorale, shameless and dirty. Then Big Mama decided to leave the house.

On the evening of 27 January, Einxhel Shkira broke her arm while playing a game with other housemates. She was taken to hospital and had an operation, after which she returned to the house.

Nominations table 
 2-in-1 housemate called 'DJs', their nominations counted as one. (Week 5 - 10)

Notes 
 : On Day 4, all housemates voted for their top three favourite people. The five housemates with the most votes were given immunity from the first public vote. They were Arjola, Donald, Fifi, Ilir and Kledi. During the second live show, the two Opinionists were also given the opportunity to give immunity to two housemates of their choosing. Balina chose Semi and Arbër chose Monika. Furthermore, Granit and Paloma were given also immunity through a public vote. Ardit, Beniada, Elhaid, Sabian and Sheila did not win immunity and were thus nominated for eviction.
 : Ilir was given immunity for the week and the power to send two housemates of his choice against public vote, though he could not choose a housemate he had already nominated. He chose Ardit and Kledi to face the public vote along with Paloma and Semi, who received the most nominations.
 : Ardit received the most votes to evict, but won the chance to return to the game. At the end of the live eviction show, he re-entered the house.
 : The viewers voted for their favourite housemate, with the one with the most votes receiving immunity and the one with the least votes being automatically nominated for eviction. Donald received the most votes, whilst Sheila received the least votes.
 : Due to the housemates breaking the rules, Big Brother decided all housemates would be up for elimination.
 : Sabian received the most votes to evict, but won the chance to return to the game. At the end of the live eviction show, he re-entered the house.
 : After being voted as the viewers’ favourite housemate, Fifi was given the right to save one of the nominated housemates (Ardit or Granit) from eviction, and replace them with another housemate of her choice. She chose to save Granit, and replaced him with Donald.
 : On Day 36, the housemates were split into duos and the game was played in the sixth week in pairs. The pairs were:  Arjola and Kledi,  Donald and Semi,  Beniada and Einxhel,  Ilir and Sabian,  Fifi and Sarah,  Beatrix and Monika, and  DJ Dagz & DJ PM and Granit.
 : On Day 39, the nominations in pairs were done, but before them Granit was eliminated and therefore DJ Dagz & DJ PM were not anymore in a duo. The housemates in pairs nominated one housemate, and then automatically his/her pair was nominated as well. Beniada and Einxhel had the most votes as a pair and were chosen to face the public vote. DJ Dagz & DJ PM, as the single housemate, had the power to send one housemate of their choice against the public vote. They choose Ilir, and by default his pair Sabian also became nominated.
 : The public voted to save rather than to evict for the two housemates with the most votes to receive immunity for the next nominations.
 : As a punishment for breaking the rules, Beatrix, Beniada, DJ Dagz & DJ PM, Donald, Einxhel, Fifi, Kledi, Sarah and Semi were automatically nominated for eviction.
 : Each housemate had to save another contestant through a saving chain. Ilir began to choose as he was the favorite housemate by the viewers. Beatrix, Beniada and Einxhel were the last housemates standing as they were not saved, and thus became the nominees.
 : Einxhel received the least number of votes to be saved. The nominations were then left up to a public vote. Antonela, Beatrix, Beniada and Meridian were exempt from this vote. Fifi and Semi received the most votes on the night so they joined Einxhel against the public vote on Day 50.
 : On Day 57, the viewers voted for their three favorite housemates to receive immunity. The housemates with the most votes were Donald, Einxhel and Ilir.
 : Each housemate had to save another contestant through a saving chain. Antonela began to choose as she was the least favorite housemate amongst them. Einxhel and Meridian were the last housemates standing as they were not saved, and thus became the nominees.
 : The public voted to save rather than to evict and the housemate with the most votes received immunity for the next nominations.
 : Meridian received the fewest votes to be saved. The nominations were then left up to a public vote. Big Mama and Claudio were exempt from this vote, as they were the new housemates, and Einxhel was also exempt from it as she was the Viewers’ Favourite of the House. Antonela, Arjola, DJ Dagz & DJ PM, Sabian and Sarah had the fewest votes and then all the other housemates could vote for them. 
 : The viewers voted for their favourite two housemates on the official Instagram page of Big Brother Albania VIP. The two housemates chosen were Donald and Ilir. They had the power to send two other contestants of their choice against the public vote. Donald chose Arjola and Ilir chose Einxhel to be nominated besides with Claudio and Ilir, who received the most nominations.
 : Big Brother gave the power to Meridian to choose between two things: to meet his favorite team and send all housemates against the public vote, without him and Ilir, who was the Viewers’ Favourite of the House and had immunity, or none of them. He chose to meet his team and sent all housemates up for eviction.
 : The viewers voted to save rather than to evict.
 : On Day 74, DJ Dagz & DJ PM had the fewest votes to save and were eliminated, but then Big Brother gave the chance to the viewers to vote for who from the two they wanted to return to the game. DJ Dagz received the most votes and returned to the house.
 : Ilir, as the Viewers’ Favourite of the House, was the house captain and had to also choose a second captain. He chose Donald, who also received immunity. Big Brother gave them the power to save four housemate each, with the last two housemates standing being sent against the public vote. Donald saved Arjola, Beniada, Einxhel and Meridian. Ilir saved Beatrix, Big Mama, Monika and Sarah.
 : As a punishment for breaking the rules, Antonela, Arjola, Big Mama, Einxhel, Monika and Sarah were automatically nominated for eviction.
 : During the live eviction show, Big Mama decided to leave the house and the eviction was cancelled, with no one being evicted.
 : Each housemate had to save another contestant through a saving chain. Arjola began to choose as she was the favorite housemate by the viewers. Antonela, Ilir and Meridian were the last housemates standing as they were not saved, and thus became the nominees.
 : Big Brother gave the power to Donald to send three housemates against the public vote, which could also include himself. He chose to put himself, Ilir and Meridian up for eviction.
 : Arbër, Egzona, Elton, Tan and Xheisara had immunity, because where the new housemates and also Donald had immunity, because was the viewers’ favourite of the House and had won the power of veto.
 : Einxhel was evicted by the public, but she was revealed to have picked the Return Ticket, therefore she went back into the House, skipping the nomination round.
 : Big Brother gave the power to Ilir to send three housemates against the public vote, which could also include himself. He chose to put himself, Arbër and Eltion up for eviction.
 : Each housemate had to save another contestant through a saving chain. Arjola began to choose as she had won a game, the previous day. She had also won the power of veto. Egzona, Tan and Xheisara were the last housemates standing as they were not saved, and thus became the nominees.
 : Each housemate had to save another contestant through a saving chain. Beatrix began to choose as she had won a game. DJ Dagz and Einxhel were the last housemates standing as they were not saved, and thus became the nominees.
 : Big Brother gave the power to Arbër to send three housemates against the public vote and he would have immunity for the next week. He chose to put Beatrix, Donald and Einxhel up for eviction.
 : Monika was nominated, due losing in a game.
 : Arbër lost the immunity and he was not allowed to vote, due breaking the rules of the game.
 : On Day 113, the viewers voted for their favorite housemate and the four housemates, with the most votes, would have immunity and also the housemate with the most votes, would have the power of veto. The housemate with the most votes was Einxhel and the other three housemates where Beniada, Donald and Ilir.
 : Each housemate had to save another contestant through a saving chain. Einxhel began to choose. Donald and Tan were the last housemates standing as they were not saved, and thus became the nominees.
 : As a punishment for breaking the rules, Donald was automatically nominated for eviction.
 : On Day 120, the viewers voted for the first finalist. Ilir had the most votes and went in the final.
 : Arjola was evicted by the public, but she was revealed to have picked the Return Ticket, therefore she went back into the House.
 : On Week 18, the viewers voted for the second finalist, between Beniada and Monika. Beniada had the most votes and went in the final.
 : The viewers voted between Arjola, Donald, Einxhel and Monika. The two housemates with the most votes, would be the third and fourth finalists and the two housemates with the least votes, would be eliminated.
 : At the final round, the public voted for the winner.

Nominations totals received 
 2-in-1 housemate called 'DJs', their nominations counted as one. (Week 5 - 10)

Reception 
Big Brother Albania is known as the most popular Reality Television Show in Albania. Big Brother VIP also became very popular, few weeks after its premiere. This was reflected on the price businesses had to pay to promote their activity. So, in 2021-2022 television season, Big Brother VIP became the most expensive show to advertise. Thus, one second before the reality show starts broadcasting costs 5700 lek, and during the broadcast, 11,000 ALL. 

The third among the most expensive are again two shows related to Big Brother VIP; the first is Big Brother VIP Daily Summary and the second Big Brother VIP – Fans' Club, where every second during the broadcast is paid 4600 ALL.

The finale was the most watched programme in the Albanian TV history. 

Albania's prime minister, Edi Rama, posted a video from Valbona with Fifi's song "Diell", which was composed inside the Big Brother VIP's house. This song became the most popular at the month of publishing.

References

External links 
Official Website
 

VIP01
Albania01
2021 Albanian television seasons
2022 Albanian television seasons